Ken Mercurio is an American business executive and author. He is best known as an expert in nutrition labeling and for having survived and recovered from a serious cycling accident.

Career
Mercurio worked 31 years for Carnation and Nestlé USA. He held many positions culminating in director of nutrition and food-product labeling, which included involvement with the U.S. delegation to the United Nations Codex Committee on Food Labeling and service on the Institute of Food Technologists Expert Committee on Functional Foods.

While working for Nestle, Mercurio was a member of the American College of Nutrition, the California Nutrition Council (serving as President in 1984), the Institute of Food Technologists, and the Society for Nutrition Education. He was a founding board member of the International Food Information Council and was a board member of the International Life Sciences Institute.

Background
He resides in Monroe, Ohio after being born in Petaluma, California and living most of his life in the Los Angeles area. He graduated from University of California, Davis, home to the U.S. Bicycling Hall of Fame, with a degree in nutrition science. His master's degree is also in nutrition, from the University of California, Los Angeles.

Mercurio continues to endurance-ride his bike despite his permanently stiff neck and near-death bike accident.<ref>[http://www.journal-news.com/news/news/local/monroe-bicyclist-prepares-for-4200-mile-roundtrip/nPWTQ/ Monroe bicyclist prepares for 4,200-mile roundtrip"] Journal-News. Retrieved December 10, 2014.</ref>

WritingHead Over Wheels – a ‘lucky stiff’ turns tragedy into a cycling triumph is his first book and focuses on his comeback from a near-death broken neck. He also authors an ongoing blog about bicycling safety. Mercurio has been published in three scholarly journals.

 "Effects of Fiber Type and Level on Mineral Excretion, Transit Time, and Intestinal Histology" (Kenneth C. Mercurio, Patricia A. Behn) Journal of Food Science. Vol. 46, No. 5, pp. 1462–1477, 1981
 "Effects of Processing on the Bioavailability and Chemistry of Iron Powders in a Liquid Milk-Based Product" (R.A. Clemens, K.C. Mercurio) Journal of Food Science. Vol. 46, No. 3, pp. 930–932, 1981
 "Nutritive and Sensory Evaluation of 20 Year Old Nonfat Dry Milk" (Kenneth C. Mercurio, Virginia A. Tadjalli) Journal of Dairy Science'' Vol. 62, No. 4, pp. 633–636, 1979

References

External links
 FDA Labeling Compliance Official site
 Head Over Wheels Biking Blog

American businesspeople
American male writers
Year of birth missing (living people)
Living people
 University of California, Davis alumni
People from Petaluma, California
People from Monroe, Ohio